Upper Saxony was the name given to the majority of the German lands held by the House of Wettin, in what is now called Central Germany (Mitteldeutschland).

Conceptual history
The name derives from the period when, after the fall of Duke Henry the Lion in 1180, the medieval Duchy of Saxony dissolved and the Duchy of Saxe-Wittenberg lands passed to the House of Ascania and later to the Wettins in the Margraviate of Meissen. These dynasties subdued the areas east of the Saale river inhabited by Polabian Slavs, and took the tribal name Sachsen (Saxons) upstream the Elbe with them. 

It was particularly to distinguish the lands from 'Lower Saxony', a concept which arose later in popular usage (though never enforced) as a term for the original Saxon lands in north and west Germany (where Low German dialects had spread), in what is now the state of Lower Saxony, as well as the adjacent Westphalian region, Holstein and the western part of today's Saxony-Anhalt north of the Harz range (Eastphalia). 

According to the Golden Bull of 1356, the Saxe–Wittenberg lands up the Elbe formed an Electorate, which in 1423 merged with Meissen under the Wettin dynasty and headed the Upper Saxon Circle. The Wettins acquired the Lusatia region by the 1635 Peace of Prague and finally were elevated to Kings of Saxony in 1806. Thus the citizens of the present-day German state of Saxony today are simply known as Saxons. This is true of the media, though the East Central German dialects of Upper Saxon (Meißenisch and Osterländisch) are placed in the Thuringian-Upper Saxon continuum.

External links
Obersachsen

Geography of Saxony